Potamanaxas thestia, the thestia skipper, is a butterfly in the family Hesperiidae. It is found in Costa Rica, Panama and Ecuador.

Subspecies
Potamanaxas thestia thestia (Ecuador)
Potamanaxas thestia cranda Evans, 1953 (Costa Rica, Panama)

References

Butterflies described in 1870
Erynnini
Butterflies of Central America
Taxa named by William Chapman Hewitson